SWRL may refer to:

 Semantic Web Rule Language
 South West Rail Link, Australia
 South West Rugby League, England